Regua leads here. For American major general, see Eldon Regua
Peso da Régua, commonly known as Régua, is a municipality in northern Portugal, in the district of Vila Real. The population in 2011 was 17,131 (of which approximately 10,000 are in the town of Régua), in an area of  km².

History

 
Peso da Régua was inhabited by Roman and barbarian invasions during the early part of the settled history. Its name, as historians have suggested, developed from a few places: first, the name Vila Reggula a Roman estate that at one time existed near the historic centre; others suggest it originated from the word récua (the ships that plied the waters along the Douro); or derived the word reguengo (a designation for lands that were attributed to the monarchy). Peso da Régua may also have its origin in the word regra, alluding to the hereditary rights of descendants achieved through forals. This theory is based on the donation of lands by Counts Henrique and Hugo in 1093, which were transferred to Egas Moniz. It is likely that this rule gave origin to the word Régoa, and later Régua. In relation to the first word, Peso, there are two opinions on its origin: the first, defends that it was derived from the place where the weighing of goods existed, or where taxes were levied; or, secondly, that the word was probably used to define the placed where animals were fed, or Penso.

Middle Ages
Peso de Régua received its foral from King Sancho I, who conferred on the locality of Godim the municipal charter.

On 3 February 1837, Peso da Régua was elevated to the status of vila, which included the annexed municipality of Godim, the civil parishes of Godim, Loureiro, Fontelas, Moura Morta and Sedielos.

Its important role as municipality only achieved its zenith in 1836, after the Marquess of Pombal designated the Douro, its vineyards and wine, as a quality brand for export. This was helped through the creation of Companhia Geral das Vinhas do Alto Douro, in 1756, which delimited the vineyards of the Douro Valley by granite markers to regulate the vineyards and wines produced. After this point, through commercialization and centralization, Régoa began to become the centre of the region.

On 31 December 1859, due to the extinction of the municipality of Canelas, the parishes of Poiares, Covelinhas, Vilarinho de Freires and Galafura were added to the municipality.

Republic
On 11 December 1933, the parish of Vinhos was created from the de-annexed region of Sedielos, resulting in a municipality of eleven parishes threaded along the Douro.

Within the integration of Canelas, in 1976, the municipality grew to twelve.

Peso da Régua was elevated to city on 14 August 1985.

In 1988, the Office Internacional de la Vigne et du Vin recognized the municipality as the Cidade Internacional da Vinha e do Vinho.

Geography

Climate
Peso da Régua as a Mediterranean climate (Köppen: Csa) with hot, dry summers and cool to mild, wet winters.

Administratively, the municipality is divided into 8 civil parishes (freguesias):
 Fontelas
 Galafura e Covelinhas
 Loureiro
 Moura Morta e Vinhós
 Peso da Régua e Godim 
 Poiares e Canelas
 Sedielos
 Vilarinho dos Freires

Economy

It cannot be expressed how important Port Wine helped to catapult the fortunes of Peso da Régua:

Tourist boats ply the river from this point carrying tourists through the locks of two dams to Régua. The town is also connected to Porto by train; the Douro railway line runs along the banks of the Douro. Until its closure in 2009, the narrow gauge railway of the Corgo line also served the town.

Notable people 
 Francisco da Silveira Pinto da Fonseca Teixeira, 1st Count of Amarante (1763–1821) a nobleman and Army officer.
 Antonia Ferreira (1811—1896) a businesswoman who lead the cultivation of port wine. 
 João de Lemos (1819–1890) a Portuguese journalist, poet and dramatist.
 José Dias Correia de Carvalho (1830-1911) Portuguese bishop of Santiago de Cabo Verde and Viseu.
 Manuel Vieira de Matos (1861–1932) was Bishop of Guarda & Archbishop of Braga.
 Domingos Duarte Lima (born 1955) a lawyer, politician, musician, organist and singer. He faces charges of murder, fraud and money laundering.

References
Notes

Sources

External links 

 Museum of Douro
 Photos from Peso da Régua

Municipalities of Vila Real District
Towns in Portugal